Robert Solomon may refer to:

 Robert Solomon (politician) (born 1931), former member of the Australian House of Representatives
 Robert M. Solomon, Methodist Bishop
 Robert C. Solomon (1942–2007), professor of philosophy at the University of Texas at Austin

See also
 Solomon (disambiguation)
 Solomon (name)